Piti is a soup in the cuisines of the South Caucasus, its bordering nations, and Central Asia, and is prepared in the oven in individual crocks with a glazed interior (called piti in Turkic languages). It is made with mutton and vegetables (tomatoes, potatoes, chickpeas), infused with saffron water to add flavour and colour, all covered by a lump of fat, and cooked in a sealed crock. Piti is served in the crock, usually accompanied by an additional plate for "disassembling" the meat and the liquid part with vegetables, which may be eaten separately as the first (soup with vegs) and second (meat) course meal.

Piti is a variety of abgoosht, particularly popular in Iran. In Armenia it is called putuk (from the Armenian word for crock).

Tasty, flavourful and nourishing piti is traditionally cooked in earthenware pots called chanag, kyupe or dopu. There are so many variations from the Balkans, Moldova, Georgia and Mediterranean countries that the name is more an idea of a recipe, rather than a named stew or soup. The etymology of the name is derived from the Turkic word bitdi, which means the end of need to eat any more food. The secret to a good piti is long, slow cooking. It is usually served in two courses: the clear soup, served with flatbread (lavash) and then the solid ingredients.

Ingredients 

The main ingredients of piti are mutton, tail fat, chickpeas, potato, onions, dried alycha or other kinds of cherry plum and saffron. Meat is gradually simmered with already soaked chickpeas in piti-pots. Potatoes, onions, alycha and saffron infusion are added 30 minutes before the meal is ready. Sumac powder is also served separately.

In Azerbaijan, piti is eaten in two steps. First, bread is crumpled in the additional plate and sprinkled with a purple mix of spices. Then, the broth is poured over it and the resulting mixture is consumed as a hearty soup. Second, more crumpled bread is added to the same plate and the remainder of the Piti (the lump of mutton fat, the meat and the vegetables) is poured over, sprinkled with the same spices, mixed together so as to break down the fat and then eaten.

Piti is cooked in different ways in Azerbaijan, especially Shaki region is renowned with its specific piti.

Shaki piti 

Shaki piti is specific because boiled chestnuts are used instead of potato. It is cooked in an earthenware pot called "dopu", which should not be a new one. Firstly, chickpeas are placed in the ceramic pots, then small pieces of mutton are added. The top layer is salted tail fat. After all of this, water is poured to the pot. Piti is cooked in 8–9 hours.

See also
 Abgoosht
 Bozbash
 Chanakhi
 Đuveč
 List of soups

Sources
V.V. Pokhlebkin, National Cuisines of the Peoples of the Soviet Union, Tsentrpoligraf Publ. House, 1978 ; English edition: V.V. Pokhlebkin, Russian Delight: A Cookbook of the Soviet People, London: Pan Books, 1978

References

Azerbaijani soups
Armenian soups
Iranian soups
Turkish soups
Georgian soups
Tajik cuisine